The 1942–43 Iowa State Cyclones men's basketball team represented Iowa State College in the 1942–43 college basketball season. The team was led by 15th-year head coach Louis Menze. In 1941–42, the Cyclones finished 11–6 overall (5–5 in the Big Six Conference). There were no captains for the season.

Roster

Player stats 
Note: PPG = Points per Game

Schedule 

|-
!colspan=6 style=""|Regular Season

|-

References 

Iowa State Cyclones men's basketball seasons
Iowa State